Jeff Strand (born December 14, 1970) is an American writer, best known for his works of horror-comedy. He has written novels, short stories, screenplays and comedy sketches. In addition to his adult-oriented horror works, Strand also writes young adult fiction. He has been nominated for the Bram Stoker Award five times, winning the award for the first time in 2022 in the long fiction category for his novella Twentieth Anniversary Screening.

Biography 

Strand was born in Baltimore, Maryland but moved to Fairbanks, Alaska at a young age. He graduated from Bowling Green State University in Green, Ohio, where he majored in creative writing. After graduating college, he briefly returned to Alaska before moving back to Ohio and eventually moving to Tucson, Arizona. He had his first short story sale in 1996, selling a story titled "The Private Diary of Leonard Parr" to Twisted Magazine, where it was featured in its first and only issue.

After a string of books in other styles, Strand published Graverobbers Wanted (No Experience Necessary), the first novel in the horror-comedy style that he would later become known for, in 2000 through the publisher Hard Shell Word Factory. He received his first nomination for the Bram Stoker Award in 2006 in the Best Novel category for his novel Pressure. In 2018 his novelette "The Tipping Point" from his short story collection Everything Has Teeth won a Splatterpunk Award in the Best Short Story category.

He currently lives with his wife in Atlanta, Georgia.

Style 

Jeff Strand is primarily known for his works of horror-comedy, which have earned him the nickname "The Clown Prince Of Horror". However, he also writes thrillers and young adult fiction. His writing is often defined by its dark humor and sparse prose style. Strand has named such authors as Douglas Adams, Richard Laymon, Dave Barry and Jack Ketchum as influences on his own writing.

Bibliography 
Novels

Demonic
Autumn Bleeds Into Winter
Cemetery Closing (Everything Must Go)
The Odds
Allison
Wolf Hunt 2
Clowns vs. Spiders
Ferocious
Cyclops Road
Stranger Things Have Happened
Blister
The Greatest Zombie Movie Ever
Wolf Hunt 2
Kumquat
I Have A Bad Feeling About This
A Bad Day For Voodoo
Faint of Heart
Lost Homicidal Maniac (Answers to “Shirley”)
Fangboy
Wolf Hunt
Draculas
Dweller
Pressure
Benjamin’s Parasite
The Severed Nose
Disposal
The Haunted Forest Tour
The Sinister Mr. Corpse
Graverobbers Wanted (No Experience Necessary)
Single White Psychopath Seeks Same
Casket for Sale (Only Used Once)
Mandibles
How to Rescue a Dead Princess
Out of Whack
Elrod McBugle on the Loose
My Pretties

Novellas

 An Apocalypse of Our Own
 Kutter
 Facial
 Stalking You Now
 Twentieth Anniversary Screening

Collections

 Freaky Briefs
 Candy Coated Madness
 Everything Has Teeth
 Dead Clown Barbecue
 Dead Clown Barbecue: Expansion Pack
 Gleefully Macabre Tales

Non-Fiction

 The Writing Life: Reflections, Recollections, and a Lot of Cursing

References

External links
Official website of Jeff Strand

1970 births
Living people
American horror writers